Nisid Hajari is an Indian-American writer, editor and foreign affairs analyst. He is the author of "Midnight's Furies: The Deadly Legacy of India's Partition," winner of the 2016 Colby Award.

Personal life
He was born in Bombay and raised in Seattle, Washington. He has lived in New York, Hong Kong, New Delhi, London and Singapore.

Education
Hajari graduated from Princeton in 1990 with a B.A. in English. He earned a master's degree in Comparative Literature at Columbia in 1996. He is a member of the Council on Foreign Relations.

Career 
Hajari is Asia editor for Bloomberg View, the editorial board of Bloomberg News. He writes about Asian politics, history and economics.

Earlier, he spent a decade as an editor at Newsweek International and Newsweek magazine in New York. He served as deputy to Fareed Zakaria from 2002 to 2006 and then as Foreign Editor and Managing Editor of the U.S. edition of the magazine from 2006 to 2011. During his tenure, the magazine won over 50 reporting, photography and digital awards for its international coverage.

From 1997 to 2001, he worked as a writer and editor for Time magazine in Hong Kong. Before moving to Asia, he spent time as a rock critic for Entertainment Weekly and a book critic for The Village Voice. He has written for The New York Times, Financial Times, Esquire, Slate, The Washington Post, Foreign Policy and Condé Nast Traveler, among other publications.

He has appeared as a foreign affairs commentator on CNN, BBC, NBC, MSNBC, CBC and National Public Radio, as well as The Charlie Rose Show.

Writing 
Hajari's "Midnight's Furies" is a narrative history of the 1947 Partition of India and Pakistan, during which as many as a million people may have lost their lives. It was named one of the best books of 2015 by NPR, the Seattle Times, Quartz, Amazon and the Daily Beast. The Wall Street Journal called it "an engaging and incisive contribution to the vast literature on Partition," while author William Dalrymple, writing in The Guardian, praised Hajari for making "the complex and tragic story of the great divide into a page-turner."

The book is the 21st winner of the William E. Colby Award, for a first book on military, intelligence or international affairs. It was named a finalist for the Council on Foreign Relations' Arthur Ross Book Award, the Shakti Bhatt Prize and the Tata Literature Live! First Book Award. It reached No. 1 on the Indian nonfiction bestseller list.

Hajari also helped edit the 2013 essay collection, "Reimagining India: Unlocking the Potential of Asia's Next Superpower."

External links 
 Personal website

References 

English-language writers from India
American male journalists
Living people
Newsweek people
Princeton University alumni
Time (magazine) people
Year of birth missing (living people)